Sussex Golden Ginger Ale is a "golden" ginger ale originally bottled in the town of Sussex, New Brunswick, Canada.  It is produced by Canada Dry Motts, a subsidiary of the Dr Pepper Snapple Group. The beverage is retailed in Canada's Maritime Provinces and northern areas in the state of  Maine.

Ginger ales generally come in two varieties: golden ginger ale; which is dark-colored and more strongly flavoured; and dry ginger ale, which is more common today. Dry ginger ale was developed during Prohibition when ginger ale was used as a mixer for alcoholic beverages, which made the stronger flavour of the golden variety undesirable. Dry ginger ale quickly became more popular than golden, and today golden ginger ales like Sussex are an uncommon and usually regional drink.

Variants 
Other soft drinks with the Sussex name have been Sussex Pale Dry Ginger Ale, Sussex Red Oval Ginger Ale, Sussex Old English Ginger Beer and Sussex Cola.

Brand ownership 
The brand has had various owners, including Sussex Mineral Spring Co., Sussex Ginger Ale Ltd., Maritime Beverages Ltd., Great Pacific Industries Inc., Canadian 7up, and Crush Canada Inc. Sussex Golden Ginger Ale is now owned by the Dr Pepper Snapple Group (formerly Cadbury Beverages Canada Inc.).

See also 
Cadbury-Schweppes
Canada Dry
Vernors

External links 
 Info on Sussex Ginger Ale label and bottle design at bottlebooks.com
 Cadbury-Schweppes Official Webpage
 Schweppes Canada Official Webpage
 Schweppes US Official Webpage
 Picture of Sussex Old English Ginger Beer Bottle c.1911 (archived page from the internet archive)
 Picture of Sussex Old English Ginger Beer Bottle

Canadian drinks
Culture of New Brunswick
Defunct companies of New Brunswick
Keurig Dr Pepper brands
Ginger ale
Cuisine of New Brunswick